"Born and Raised" is a song recorded by Canadian country group Hunter Brothers. The song was written by Brad Rempel of High Valley with Jim Beavers and Seth Mosley. It was the fifth single off their debut album Getaway.

Background
J.J. Hunter of the Hunter Brothers stated "the song is all about the things that make us proud of where we’re from. We’re honouring family, farm, faith and community; the people and things that made us who we are today".

Critical reception
Nanci Dagg of Canadian Beats Media said that "if you listen to this tune with your eyes closed for a moment, you can imagine yourself looking around your own hometown with amazement and with a feeling of pride". Brittany Thompson of iHeartRadio described the song as "an anthem for small towns across the country". Top Country stated that with "Born and Raised", "the Hunter Brothers are soon to be on everyone's radars".

Accolades

Commercial performance
"Born and Raised" reached a peak of number nine on the Billboard Canada Country chart dated January 6, 2018, marking the group's first career top ten hit. It has been certified Gold by Music Canada.

In popular culture
"Born and Raised" was selected as the official anthem for the 2019 World Junior Ice Hockey Championships in Vancouver and Victoria, British Columbia through an online voting contest run by SiriusXM Canada. It defeated songs by fellow Canadian artists, The Strumbellas, Monster Truck, and The Glorious Sons.

Music video
The official music video was for "Born and Raised" premiered exclusively on CBC Music on August 23, 2017, and was directed by Gavin Michael Booth. It was filmed on their family's farm in Shaunavon, Saskatchewan and used footage from a benefit concert they held there to raise money for community organizations in which approximately 12,000 people showed up to see the band.

Charts

Certifications

References

2017 songs
2017 singles
Hunter Brothers songs
Open Road Recordings singles
Songs written by Brad Rempel
Songs written by Jim Beavers
Songs written by Seth Mosley